Harry Rowley, (23 January 1904 – 19 February 1982) was an English footballer. He played for many clubs during his career, including Manchester City, Manchester United, Shrewsbury Town, Oldham Athletic, and Burton Albion. During his United career, he scored 55 goals in seven seasons.

1904 births
1982 deaths
English footballers
Manchester City F.C. players
Manchester United F.C. players
Shrewsbury Town F.C. players
Oldham Athletic A.F.C. players
People from Bilston
Gillingham F.C. players
English Football League players
Association football forwards